Chongwenmenwai Subdistrict is a subdistrict located in the southern part of Dongcheng District, Beijing, China. As of 2020, It has a population of 44,545.

The subdistrict got its current name due to its location outside of Chongwenmen, a gate of the former Beijing city wall.

History

Administrative Division 
As of 2021, there are a total of 11communities in the subdistrict. They are as follows:

References

Dongcheng District, Beijing
Subdistricts of Beijing